Peter Robert Henry Mond, 4th Baron Melchett (24 February 1948 – 29 August 2018), also known as Peter Melchett, was an English jurist and politician. He succeeded to the title of Baron Melchett in 1973.

Background
The son of the British Steel Corporation chairman Sir Julian Mond (later the 3rd Baron Melchett) and Sonia Melchett (now Sinclair), Mond was educated at Eton and Pembroke College, Cambridge, where he read law. He went on to take an MA in criminology at Keele University, and later researched the sentencing of cannabis users at the London School of Economics and at the Institute of Psychiatry (1971–1973). In the late 1970s Melchett was the first chair of a (short-lived) Legalise Cannabis Campaign. For over 30 years, he was a patron of Prisoners Abroad, a registered charity that supports British citizens who are imprisoned overseas. He was a Special Lecturer at the School of Biological Sciences, University of Nottingham, from 1984 to 2002, and received an honorary doctorate from Newcastle University in 2013.

Political career

Lord Melchett succeeded to his titles in 1973 upon the death of his father. When Labour won re-election in October 1974, he was made a Lord-in-waiting (House of Lords whip) by Harold Wilson, working in the Department of the Environment under Anthony Crosland. According to Wilson, he was the youngest government minister appointed at least in modern times, and he was promoted twice within two years. As well as departmental responsibilities, he took particularly controversial legislation through the House (including pension legislation and bills nationalising the aircraft and shipbuilding industries).

At the Department of the Environment, he chaired a Government inquiry into the then controversial area of pop festivals, leading to legislation that is still in force (credited by Michael Eavis as the basis on which the Glastonbury Festival has been able to continue to flourish), and it ensured that some of the UK's first wildlife protection laws were passed.

In 1975, he was made a Parliamentary Under-Secretary of State in the Department of Industry, where he was responsible for small firms and workers cooperatives. When James Callaghan succeeded Wilson as Labour leader and prime minister in 1976, Melchett moved to become Minister of State at the Northern Ireland Office, responsible for health (and social services) and education (including sports and the arts), two major departments covering almost the whole range of social policy, with by far the largest share of Government spending in Northern Ireland. Melchett increased teacher numbers to give the best pupil/teacher ratio in the UK, modernised provision for the mentally ill, and saw Northern Ireland provided with world class sporting facilities. He was responsible for the successful passage of a bill making it possible to set up integrated (non-sectarian) schools.

In his book Minority Verdict – Experiences of a Catholic Public Servant, Maurice Hayes, the most senior Roman Catholic civil servant in Northern Ireland, spoke very highly about working with Melchett: [He] "did not have everything spelled-out or interpreted for him. More important, he related to the young people around, he was mobile, accessible, and very attractive to large numbers of people. He also had a lot of courage and fighting for issues that did not fall within his brief, which involved some aspect of human rights or discrimination or criminal justice." One such issue was a case in which Melchett helped to secure a pardon for a young girl who had been convicted and imprisoned for killing her father, who had sexually abused and assaulted the girl's mother and turned his attentions on her younger sister. In his book, Hayes also said: "Melchett chafed at the constraints that were put on him in the name of security or convention and on his ability to travel to any part of Northern Ireland. He went out as often as he could and on whatever pretext to what were regarded 'difficult areas' – generally places that no minister had ever visited before, or any representative of government more exalted or benign than a policeman or a summons server – and found the people always glad to see him."

After Margaret Thatcher won the 1979 election, Melchett served on the Opposition Front Bench in the House of Lords from 1979 to 1981, covering the environment and wildlife, and leading for the Opposition on the Wildlife and Countryside Bill, which became an Act in 1981. The bill faced around 1200 amendments at the Committee stage in the Lords, said to be more than any other Bill, many moved by Melchett. After amendments, the Wildlife and Countryside Act 1981 introduced proper protection for key wildlife sites (Sites of Special Scientific Interest) and additional protection for numerous species, including (controversially) bats, and Melchett's personal favourite, protection from shooting for the Curlew, insisted on by the Lords after initial protection introduced in the Lords was rejected by the Commons.

Career after politics

Immediately after he ceased be a minister in 1979, Melchett was appointed part-time Chairman of Community Industry, a government funded scheme run by the National Association of Youth Clubs, which employed 8,000 young people in particularly deprived areas in England, Scotland and Wales. Community Industry aimed to give the experience of working in a real job, with a wage, to young people who were unable to get a job because of severe disadvantage. People were employed in groups of around 10, under the supervision of an experienced craftsperson, to learn basic skills and to get used to the routine of regular work. Melchett left Community Industry in 1986.

From 1979 to 1985, Melchett worked in a voluntary capacity for a number of wildlife groups and for the Ramblers' Association as President from 1981 to 1984 and Vice President from 1984. He also served for a spell on the Ramblers’ Council, which he claimed was his only elected office. In that period, he was also a Council member of the Royal Society for the Protection of Birds, and help found and chaired (1980–1987) the national liaison body for wildlife and environment groups, Wildlife Link (now Wildlife and Countryside Link), which brought together around 30 NGOs, including Friends of the Earth and Greenpeace, which had been excluded from previous liaison arrangements. He was a Trustee of WWF UK from 1977 to 1984 and an advisor to Friends of the Earth and the RSPCA.

In 1985, he took part in peaceful protest organised by the Snowball movement, at the Sculthorpe US nuclear air force base close to the farm in Norfolk. Along with many other protesters, he and his partner, Cassandra Wedd, made a symbolic cut to the fence around the air base, and they were arrested and convicted of attempted criminal damage.

Having announced himself sick of the 'lying game' of Westminster politics, and partly on the strength of his antinuclear campaigning and direct action, Lord Melchett was appointed to the Board of Greenpeace UK in 1985, and then took up position of Executive Director of Greenpeace UK in 1989.[4]

Greenpeace UK grew from an organisation with a turnover of £1.4m, 12 staff and 25,000 supporters in 1985, to a turnover of £7.5m, 80 staff and over 200,000 supporters in 2001. Greenpeace UK's financial contribution to Greenpeace International increased from £166,000 to £2m, and increased as a proportion of gross income from 5% to 25%.   Greenpeace campaign successes in that period included a decrease in whales killed worldwide from around 70,000 to 1,000, international treaties banning the dumping of nuclear, industrial and oil industry waste (including Shell's controversial Brent Spar oil storage facility) and human sewage in the North East Atlantic, an international treaty protecting the continent of Antarctica, the temporary abandonment of building new nuclear power stations in the UK, the treaty banning nuclear weapons testing worldwide, and Greenpeace's worldwide, campaign against genetically modified crops and food.

Greenpeace launched its global campaign against GM crops in 1997, and Lord Melchett was arrested in 1999 when he took part in an environmental protest against a genetically modified crop trial in Lyng, Norfolk, at which GM maize was cut down and removed by 28 volunteers. Melchett spent a night in police custody and then a night in Norwich Prison before being released on bail. The case came to court in 2000 when Melchett and his 27 codefendants were unanimously acquitted of theft and criminal damage.

When he left in 2001, Melchett was the longest serving Executive Director of a Greenpeace national office. The UK model of campaigning was increasingly adopted by Greenpeace's other 30 national offices and was accepted as being in part responsible for Greenpeace's successes with both the Brent Spar and genetic engineering campaigns.

Melchett was also Chair of the Board of Greenpeace Japan, which became the third largest and most influential environmental organisation in Japan, securing a number of significant changes in Government policy and corporate behaviour.

When he retired as Greenpeace's Executive Director, he remained on the organisation's international board and took up a part-time consultancy work with IKEA, Iceland and ASDA supermarkets, and briefly with industry PR company Burson-Marsteller UK.[6] Burson-Marsteller in the USA had formerly been PR consultants for the Monsanto Company, and Lord Melchett stood down from the Greenpeace International Board following accusation that his employment with Burson-Marsteller compromised his integrity.

He was Policy Director at the Soil Association from 2002. The Soil Association has campaigned against the introduction of GM crops and food, and for the introduction of support for English organic farmers through the Government's Organic Entry Level Scheme (subsequently Countryside Stewardship). The Soil Association has published reports and campaigned on school, nursery and hospital food, the poor quality of children's food in popular restaurants, organic farming and climate change, the nutritional value of organic food, resource use in agriculture, feeding the world, GM, pesticides, the abuse of antibiotics in livestock farming and animal welfare.

Melchett played a leading role in guiding the Alliance to Save Our Antibiotics, an alliance of health, environmental and animal-welfare groups – coordinated by non-governmental organisations Compassion in World Farming, the Soil Association and Sustain: the alliance for better food and farming, campaigning to stop the overuse of antibiotics in livestock. The Alliance was founded in 2009 and has helped put the issue of antibiotic resistance at the centre of farm policy. By 2018, large cuts in antibiotic use in British farming had been achieved, and the European Union had agreed to plans to ban routine farm antibiotic use.

Melchett was one of the leading people responsible for launching the Soil Association's successful school food programme, Food for Life and Food for Life Served Here, a certification scheme for healthy and sustainable catering, currently covering 1.7 million meals served outside the home daily. He was the first Chair of the Food for Life Partnership, led by the Soil Association – originally in partnership with the Focus on Food Campaign, Garden Organic and the Health Education Trust, awarded a five-year, £16.9m Big Lottery grant (2007–2011) that resulted in engagement with 20% of English schools (which now covers over half the primary schools in England), and which is delivering radical improvements in school meal take-up, significant improvements in attendance, behaviour and academic achievement, and major improvements in children's and their parents’ diets.

From 1973, Melchett was the managing director of 890-acre (360 hectares) Courtyard Farm at Ringstead near Hunstanton,[5],which was owned by his father, and is now owned by a charitable trust. The farm fully converted to organic in 2000, and crops include barley, wheat, and beans, all grown for seed, and clover and grass for cattle feed.  The prize-winning farm is well known for the wildlife conservation work done there over the last 50 years, and for the high level of public access provided for more than 30 years.  The farm has been involved in numerous agricultural and conservation research projects.

Panel and board memberships
Melchett was a member of the House of Lords Select Committee on Science and Technology (1981–1985), a member of the BBC's Rural Affairs Committee (2005–2018), the Government's Rural Climate Change Forum (2009–2010) and Organic Action Plan Group (2002–2008), and the Department of Education's School Lunches Review Panel (2005). Melchett was also on the board of the EU £12m Research Project 'Quality Low Input Food'.

Personal life
Peter Melchett was in a relationship with Cassandra "Cass" Wedd for 45 years, although they were never married. They had two children who were educated at a comprehensive school instead of the family tradition of Eton College. Lord Melchett's daughter Jessica Joan Mond-Wedd is a barrister, whilst his son, Justin "Jay"Julian Mond Wedd, is a farmer.

Lord Melchett was a vocal opponent of hereditary peerdom and  declared in a BBC radio broadcast for Desert Island Discs that he had deprived his son Jay (who farms at the family farm in Ringstead) of the right to succeed him as 5th Baron Melchett, of Landford in the County of Southampton, and 5th Baronet of Hartford Hill in the County of Cheshire, because his son was born out of wedlock, which means the extinction of the barony and of the baronetcy upon his death.

Coat of arms

See also
Ludwig Mond Award
Melchett Medal
Mond gas
Brunner Mond & Co.

References

External links
Profile, Huffington Post: retrieved 21 January 2015
Greenpeace: Peter Melchett 18 January 2002
British Government Ministers, 1970–2009
Welcome To Courtyard Farm | Ringstead | Norfolk

1948 births
2018 deaths
English people of German-Jewish descent
Barons in the Peerage of the United Kingdom
People from King's Lynn and West Norfolk (district)
People educated at Eton College
Alumni of Pembroke College, Cambridge
Alumni of Keele University
Alumni of the London School of Economics
Baronesses- and Lords-in-Waiting
Labour Party (UK) hereditary peers
Northern Ireland Office junior ministers
English farmers
English landowners
English environmentalists
English atheists
Peter Mond ,4th Baron Melchett
English republicans
Melchett